"The Mind of Simon Foster" is the fifty-seventh episode (the twenty-second episode of the third season (1988–89)) of the television series The Twilight Zone. In this episode, an unemployed man resorts to selling his memories.

Plot
In the year 1999, Simon Foster is unemployed. He pawns all his valuables, but the broker realizes Simon has a larger need for money, and tries to interest him in memory transference, an illegal variation of the trendy technology of "memory-dipping". Memory-dipping involves renting people's copied memories. Copied memories do not provide a perfectly real experience, so a black market has emerged for actual memories cut from a person's mind and transferred over. Simon is hesitant, but after a threat of eviction he returns to the pawn shop and sells his high school graduation. Simon gets enough to pay his rent, but when the landlord sees Simon now has money he begins extorting him. Over the next months Simon sells his fifth birthday, his first steps, and his first time at the circus.

Simon gets a job interview, but as part of the interview he is quizzed on minute details of his college years, which he can no longer remember because of how long ago he graduated. He returns to the pawn shop and sells the first time he told a woman he loved her. After the procedure, Simon pulls the broker's gun on him and demands his memories back. The broker points out that he cannot get them back because they have been sold to third parties, but Simon refuses to listen. The broker then says there is a way but it is not perfect.

Simon has another job interview with the unemployment agency. When he is questioned about his typing experience, Simon starts rambling on at great length about his memories, taken from different and in some cases contradicting lives, not letting the interviewer get a word in edgewise. How and why he obtained these memories is not revealed.

External links
 

1989 American television episodes
The Twilight Zone (1985 TV series season 3) episodes
Fiction set in 1999
Unemployment in fiction
Alternate history television episodes
Fiction about memory